Southern is the brand name used by the Govia Thameslink Railway (GTR) train operating company on the Southern routes of the Thameslink, Southern and Great Northern franchise in England. It is a subsidiary of Govia, a joint venture between transport groups Go-Ahead and Keolis, and has operated the South Central franchise since August 2001 and the Gatwick Express service since June 2008. When the passenger rail franchise was subsumed into GTR, Southern was split from Gatwick Express and the two became separate brands, alongside the Thameslink and Great Northern brands.

Southern operates the majority of commuter services from its Central London terminals at London Bridge and London Victoria to South London, East and West Sussex, as well as regional services in parts of Hampshire, Kent and Surrey. It also provides services between Watford Junction and Croydon via the West London Line.

The company also operates services from Eastbourne to Ashford, Brighton to Ore, Brighton to Seaford, Brighton to Southampton and Clapham Junction to Watford Junction.

For three consecutive years from 2016 to 2018, Southern came last on passenger satisfaction in surveys conducted by the consumer group Which?, scoring low for value for money, reliability, and punctuality in 2018. In 2022 Southern was ranked second-worst on overall passenger satisfaction in a survey conducted by Transport Focus.

History
Following the end of British Rail, Connex South Central was awarded the Network SouthCentral franchise by the Director of Passenger Rail Franchising. Operations began on 26 May 1996.

In March 2000, the Shadow Strategic Rail Authority (SSRA) announced its intention to relet the franchise from May 2003 with Connex and Govia the shortlisted bidders. In October 2000 the SSRA announced that Govia had been awarded the franchise and would operate it from May 2003. Govia negotiated a deal with Connex to buy out the remainder of its franchise, this was completed in August 2001. Govia trading as SouthCentral took over operations on 26 August 2001. The franchise was originally to run for twenty years, but in 2002 the Strategic Rail Authority changed the way it handled financing agreements and therefore Govia was re-awarded with a seven-and-a-half-year franchise until December 2009.

In May 2003 the franchise was rebranded as Southern in a recall of the pre-nationalisation Southern Railway, using a green roundel logo with Southern in yellow in a green bar.

In April 2007 the Department for Transport (DfT) announced that the Gatwick Express franchise was to be incorporated into the main South Central franchise. This was part of a plan to increase capacity on the Brighton Main Line, involving the extension of peak-hour services from Gatwick to Brighton and Eastbourne from December 2008. This doubled the number of London to Brighton express trains during those periods.

In December 2008, Southern took over the services on the Redhill to Tonbridge Line from Southeastern.

The South Central franchise end date was brought forward to September 2009 upon the integration of the Gatwick Express service, to allow the new operator to be in place during major changes to the timetable in and around South London in December 2009. In the run-up to the bidding process for the franchise, reports emerged suggesting that Transport for London, the operator of the London Overground service, wished to take control of all overground services in South London, including the 'Metro' area of the South Central franchise. However, such a transfer never took place and the DfT put out the entire franchise for tender.

In August 2008 the DfT shortlisted Govia, National Express, NedRail and Stagecoach for the new South Central franchise. In June 2009 the DfT announced that Govia had retained the franchise, to start on 20 September 2009.

In March 2012 the Department for Transport announced that Abellio, FirstGroup, Govia, MTR and Stagecoach had been shortlisted for the new Thameslink, Southern and Great Northern franchise. The Invitation to Tender was to be issued in October 2012, with the successful bidder announced in spring 2013. However, in the wake of the collapse of the InterCity West Coast refranchising process, the government announced in October 2012 that the process would be put on hold pending the results of a review.

In December 2012, Southern's  to  via  service ceased, being partially replaced by London Overground's new  to  service.

At the conclusion of the Southern franchise in July 2015, the South Central franchise was merged into the Govia Thameslink Railway franchise, which is run as a management contract rather than a traditional franchise. However the Southern brand was retained.

2007 and 2008 timetables
Southern was criticised for major changes to its timetables in December 2007 and December 2008.

In December 2007, Southern changed the arrangement for the splitting of services to and from London Victoria on the Arun Valley Line, opting to split trains at Horsham rather than Barnham. Some passengers criticised this change as it increased the journey time to and from London by up to 10 minutes from certain stations, while in the event of services running behind schedule, trains were sometimes not split at Horsham, and proceeded non-stop to Barnham, leaving Arun Valley commuters at Horsham with the prospect of no onward trains.

In December 2008 further timetable changes included the introduction of the extended Gatwick Express services. However, reliability and timekeeping on some of the new services were considered poor, leading to several public meetings being held. On 22 January 2009, Southern responded to some of these criticisms. During 2009 these services have recorded improved timekeeping and criticisms have since subsided.

The new timetable also led to unhappiness due to the difference in speed and frequency of service between East Coastway services and those on the Brighton Main Line.

December 2010 timetable
Further changes to the timetable were made in December 2010; the first timetable change to include many of the requirements of the new franchise. Additional services were included at evenings and weekends. In the London area a 'metro' frequency of service was introduced on most routes with the extension of the weekday daytime four-trains-per-hour norm to late evenings (up to around midnight), Saturdays and Sundays. In addition, new late-night services were introduced from London on Friday and Saturday nights with last trains leaving central London at around 00:30.

Outside London, a new later-evening service was introduced to Uckfield from London Bridge, new late-night services from Brighton along the West Coastway line and direct services between Southampton and Brighton on Sundays.

Punctuality and overcrowding
In January 2015 Southern hit controversy when it was revealed that the 7.29am Brighton to London Victoria train failed to get in on time on any occasion out of all 240 attempts in 2014. Later in May 2015 it was revealed that Southern had fined passengers for standing in first class on an overcrowded train. Only 20% of Southern trains arrived on time in the year from April 2015 to March 2016, and there was an ongoing industrial dispute over driver-only operated trains. In late 2016, the Transport Select Committee told ministers to "get a grip" on railway franchises, with their report asking if the train operator was in breach of their contractual obligations due to the large number of cancelled trains, and went on to say, "in normal circumstances, this would be grounds for termination of the contract".

2016 amended timetable
In 2016, the company introduced an "amended timetable [that] would be a temporary measure until staffing returned to normal" to be announced on 5 July. The National Union of Rail, Maritime and Transport Workers (RMT) trade union said that 350 services would be cancelled every day (the company ran 2,242 weekday services in the previous timetable). The company said it had insufficient personnel, and too many were taking sick leave; the union denied that high levels of sickness were the cause of cancellations, while agreeing that there were an insufficient number of guards and drivers.

The government Department for Transport said that the situation was unacceptable. While the company was obliged to notify the department in advance, this did not amount to giving the company permission for the changes. The RMT union general secretary Mick Cash said the government had permitted GTR to introduce the emergency timetable, but that it was "nothing to do with staff sickness and everything to do with gross mismanagement of this franchise and the failure to employ enough guards and drivers. ... a cynical and cowardly ploy".

The London Evening Standard mentioned Southern in an article in June 2016 "Southern rail suggests commuter goes on 100 mile detour to Clapham instead of her normal six minute journey". In June 2016, amongst criticism of the performance of its services, Go-Ahead warned of lower than anticipated profits on its Govia Thameslink Railway franchises, leading to an 18% drop in the Go-Ahead share price.

From 31 October 2016, Southern restored the full weekday timetable.

Control of doors and strikes

In 2016, Southern altered its method of door operation, with control of the doors moving from the conductor to the driver. Southern said this would allow the conductor to concentrate on the passengers, but the RMT and Associated Society of Locomotive Engineers and Firemen (ASLEF) unions said that it was an attempt to make conductors unnecessary and would be unsafe. The rail safety regulator, the Rail Standards and Safety Board has said that "We have 30 years of data which we have analysed. We have found that the driver performing the task does not increase the risk to passengers at all." In 2016, the RMT and ASLEF unions went on strike over the changes, causing severe disruption to Southern services. The strikes continued into 2017.

The BBC suggested that the RMT union are particularly worried about the new method of operation because if drivers (rather than conductors) control the doors then trains could run without conductors and thus any strike by conductors would not have the power to cancel trains.

In December 2016, it was announced that the government would pay £50million to Southern to cover the costs of the disruption caused by the strikes, due to a deal between the government and Southern. This deal means that the government pays £38million for lost revenue and £15million in compensation to passengers. This deal also means that Govia Thameslink Railway will save around £1.1million in pay for striking workers. Commentators argue that the government gave a management contract rather than a normal franchise to GTR in order to push through DOO. The management contract meant that GTR did not have the incentive to resolve strikes as a normal franchisee would have, as the government lost money from strikes rather than GTR.

On 2 February 2017, the TUC announced that talks between Southern and ASLEF had reached an agreement meaning that the dispute with ASLEF had been resolved. However, the RMT union said it was 'betrayed' by Southern and that strikes by the RMT would continue.

Commencing 29 June 2017, ASLEF implemented an overtime ban, aiming to highlight a claimed failure by Southern to recruit adequate staff.

Routes

The network of services operated by Southern includes local suburban ("Metro") services in South London and regional services extending into the southern Home Counties. All routes are south of the river Thames, with the exception of the West London Route service, which crosses London via Shepherd's Bush and runs up the West Coast Main Line to Watford Junction. Along with the Thameslink and the Elizabeth line routes, this provides one of the few long-distance National Rail routes to run right across London instead of terminating at one of the London rail termini. Southern routes which do not serve London include the West Coastway and East Coastway Lines along the south coast of both East and West Sussex, Kent and Hampshire.

Details of each route, including maps and timetables, are on Southern's website (see External links below). As of December 2022, the off-peak Monday-Saturday service pattern, with frequencies in 'trains per hour' (tph), consists of:

Rolling stock

, Southern services are entirely operated by 214 Class 377 electric multiple units, other than on unelectrified Marshlink line and the Uckfield branch Oxted line routes which use Class 171 diesel multiple units, and on the East and West Coastway routes, where the Class 377 stock is supported by a smaller fleet of older Class 313 units.

South Central inherited a fleet of Class 205, Class 207, Class 319, Class 421, Class 423, Class 455 and Class 456 multiple-unit trains from Connex South Central. Southern inherited a Class 73 locomotive and Class 460 Juniper trains from Gatwick Express.

A franchise commitment was to replace all the Mark 1 slam-door stock, resulting in Southern ordering 28 three-car DC, 139 four-car DC and 15 four-car dual-voltage Class 377 Electrostars in September 2001 and March 2002 to replace the Class 421, Class 422 and Class 423s.

In August 2002 Southern ordered nine two-car and six four-car Class 171 Turbostars to replace the Class 205s and Class 207s on the routes that are not fully electrified. In 2006 a tenth two-car Class 171 was transferred from South West Trains.

In 2007, Southern ordered 12 four-car, dual-voltage Class 377/5 Electrostars to replace the remaining twelve Class 319s for transfer to First Capital Connect. In March 2008 Go Ahead purchased a further 11 Class 377/5s. All 23 ended up being sublet to First Capital Connect to provide extra stock for the Thameslink Programme Key Output Zero changes from March 2009. However, due to delays in their production, Class 377/2s were also sublet. To cover for this, Class 350/1s were subleased from London Midland.

To provide stock for the extended Gatwick Express services to Brighton, in 2008 Southern leased 17 Class 442 Wessex Electrics withdrawn by South West Trains in early 2007. After retaining the franchise in 2009, Southern leased the remaining seven Class 442s. The last of the Class 460 Junipers were withdrawn in September 2012.

To release Class 377/3s for use on London suburban services, Southern introduced a fleet of ex-London Overground Class 313s on the Coastway lines from May 2010.

In 2011, Southern announced that, because of delays in procuring new trains for the Thameslink Programme, the 23 Class 377/5s on sub-lease to First Capital Connect would not be returned in time to deliver the operator's planned capacity increases from the December 2013 timetable change. It therefore began a process to procure 130 new vehicles. It was announced in December 2011 that Bombardier had been contracted to supply 26 five-car Class 377/6s. In November 2012 it was announced that an option for a further 40 vehicles was being exercised.

All twenty-four Class 456s were transferred to South West Trains in 2014 after the introduction of the Class 377/6 fleet.

In April 2016, Southern commenced a lease for nine three-carriage Class 170s last used by First ScotRail from Eversholt Rail Group. Four (170421-424) moved to Wolverton Works in 2015 and were reconfigured as two two-carriage and two four-carriage Class 171s. The other five (170416-420) remain in Scotland on sub-lease to Abellio ScotRail and were scheduled to move to Southern in 2018.

Southern withdrew its Class 455s in May 2022.

On 7 September 2022, three Class 171s, having been reformed to three-car formations and renumbered to 170422–424, transferred to East Midlands Railway.

Current fleet

Future Fleet
From 2022, Great Northern will operate 6 Class 387/3s, as this will allow some Class 387/2s to be transferred to Southern.

Past fleet
Former units operated by Southern include:

Depots
Southern's fleet is maintained at Brighton Lovers Walk and Selhurst depots. The Gatwick Express fleet is maintained at Stewarts Lane.

Light maintenance is also carried out at Littlehampton for the electric fleet, and St Leonards for the class 171 fleet when on Marshlink services.

Future
Southern, as part of its successful bid for the South Central franchise in 2009, made several commitments to improving services across the network. These included:
 Increasing the length of suburban services in South London to 10 cars between 2011 and 2013
 Increasing the service level on all routes in South London to 4 trains per hour (tph) until 23:00 each day, and the introduction of late-night services on Fridays and Saturdays
 The introduction of an hourly service on Sundays between Brighton and Southampton Central, and an increase in the number of late-night services between Brighton and Worthing
 The introduction of late-night services on the London to Uckfield route
 Installation of new ticket gates at 22 stations across the network
 Increasing the number of car-parking spaces at stations by 1,000 and the number of cycle spaces by 1,500
 Cleaning and refreshing of all stations and trains on the network

Uckfield–Lewes line
The franchise consultation paper released at the beginning of the 2009 franchising process stated that the ultimate franchise agreement would include a change mechanism to enable the DfT to incorporate additional routes into the South Central franchise, and it invited bidders to submit priced options for schemes put forward by stakeholders. One such scheme could, as indicated in the South Central Franchise Consultation Paper, be the reopening of the Uckfield – Lewes line, closed in 1969. In recent years, several interested parties have been examining the possibility of reopening the line.

Future of the franchise
In January 2016, Transport for London announced a proposal to take over the London suburban parts of the franchise in 2021 through a partnership with the Department for Transport to form a new suburban metro service. However, the plan was rejected by Transport Secretary Chris Grayling in December 2016.

In January 2017, it was reported that the Department for Transport was considering temporarily renationalising the franchise if the service did not improve.

On 17 June 2021 the DfT extended the current contract from 19 September 2021 to 31 March 2022.

The contract for the delivery of Thameslink, Southern and Great Northern services was extended by the DfT on 25 March 2022. The current contract will now expire on 1 April 2028.

Rolling out of smartcards

Southern was criticised in January 2007 for not wishing to introduce Oyster Pay As You Go on its London routes, stating that it was not financially viable. In 2007 Southern introduced Oyster on its Watford Junction to Clapham Junction route, and the company later agreed in principle to the introduction of Oyster across its network, but did not give any firm timescale, managing director Chris Burchell saying "There are still a number of outstanding issues that need to be discussed with TfL, but we do not believe these will prevent us making PAYG a reality on our network. We look forward to discussions with TfL on how we can make this happen as soon as possible for our passengers." In its successful franchise bid in 2009, Southern said it was committed to rolling out Oyster Pay As You Go in the London area, but also that such a move was subject to industry agreement. Since 2 January 2010, Oyster Pay As You Go has been valid on all its London routes, along with most other train services in the London area. In addition, Oyster is valid on Southern services beyond the Greater London boundary as far as Epsom, Epsom Downs, Tattenham Corner, Upper Warlingham, Caterham and Gatwick Airport.

The Key

In 2012, Southern became the first rail company in England to use the ITSO card on its network. The Key is a smartcard similar to Transport for London's Oyster card. Tickets for the smartcard are available only in Single, Return, Weekly, Monthly and Annual Season tickets. Southern plans to add a Pay-As-You-Go option in the near future, but tests on this are still in progress. There are three types of The Key smartcards: Child, Adult and Staff. All child smartcards need a photograph to prove the age of the holder, while adults who wish to use their smartcard only for single and return tickets do not require a picture. The Key is insured so that if lost or stolen it can be de-activated and the tickets transferred to a new card sent out in the post.

The Key allows customers to buy Plusbus for the Crawley and Brighton areas. This is because Metrobus (which operates in Crawley) and Brighton and Hove Buses are owned by Go-Ahead Group, Southern's parent company. Brighton & Hove Buses also uses The Key on its buses but it is not possible to use a B&H bus key on Southern and vice versa at the moment unless using Plusbus. Southern is looking to change this by the end of 2013.

The Key operates only at stations managed by Southern and outside London because it is not currently compatible with the Oyster card readers. Southern has been working with Transport for London and the Department for Transport to change this, and the Oyster card readers should be compatible by December 2013.

Southern operated a pilot for The Key between Brighton and Seaford in 2010 as these stations are served only by Southern trains (with the exception of Brighton). This was a success and so in 2012 it began to gradually expand across the network. Originally the only ticket type available on The Key was season tickets; in August 2013 Southern added Return and Single tickets to The Key.

See also

 Rail transport in Great Britain
 Commuter rail in the United Kingdom

Notes

References

External links

 

Airport rail links in London
Go-Ahead Group companies
Keolis
Railway companies established in 2001
Railway operators in London
Rail transport in East Sussex
Rail transport in Hampshire
Rail transport in Kent
Rail transport in Surrey
Rail transport in West Sussex
Train operating companies in the United Kingdom
2001 establishments in England